The former St. Alban's Episcopal Church is an historic stone Late Gothic Revival-style Episcopal church located on the southwest corner of Hammond and Eastern avenues in Lidgerwood, North Dakota. On December 3, 1992, it was added to the National Register of Historic Places. As of that date, the building housed Harmony Lodge No. 53 of the Ancient, Free & Accepted Masons. Harmony Lodge, founded in 1899, surrendered its charter in 1994.

References

Episcopal church buildings in North Dakota
Gothic Revival church buildings in North Dakota
Masonic buildings in North Dakota
Churches on the National Register of Historic Places in North Dakota
Stone churches in North Dakota
National Register of Historic Places in Richland County, North Dakota